Joshua L. "Scruffy" Wallace  is a Canadian bagpipe player best known for his 12-year tenure with the Boston Celtic punk group Dropkick Murphys.

Early life
Wallace was born in the United Kingdom but moved to Canada at a young age. He started playing bagpipes as a teenager and at fifteen joined the 2137 Royal Canadian Army Cadet Corps (The Calgary Highlanders).

Dropkick Murphys 
Wallace joined the Dropkick Murphys in 2003 and first appeared on their 2005 album The Warrior's Code. Wallace would record four albums with the band before leaving them in June 2015.

The Mahones
Wallace joined The Mahones in February 2016.

Personal life
Wallace is married with 2 sons, and the family lives in Dorchester, Massachusetts, a neighborhood of Boston. Speaking on his son possibly learning how to play the bagpipes, Wallace said "I'm not going through what my mother went through. No way. He can be a drummer or something". His favorite drinks are Lagavulin 16-year single malt scotch and Miller High Life. His favorite band is Slayer.

References

American bagpipe players
British emigrants to the United States
American punk rock musicians
Dropkick Murphys members
Living people
Musicians from Boston
Canadian punk rock musicians
Scottish punk rock musicians
Year of birth missing (living people)
Calgary Highlanders soldiers
Canadian Army soldiers
Calgary Highlanders